Mount Victory is an active volcano on the north east coast of Oro Province, Papua New Guinea with a height of . It is bounded by the Ajova River.

The mountain is a major andesite volcano, with the magma known for its high levels of Nickel and Chromium. Captain John Moresby named the mountain after . The volcano was used as a beacon due by ships, due to the red crater glow. It last erupted in 1935.

Hydrographers Range, Mount Lamington, and Mount Trafalgar are three other large Quaternary stratovolcanoes in south-eastern New Guinea.

See also
 Victory (volcano)

References

References cited

Oro Province
Victory
Victory